Renaud Gagneux (15 May 1947 – 24 January 2018) was a French composer.

Gagneux studied piano with Alfred Cortot and composition with Henri Dutilleux at the École Normale in Paris. In 1966 he went to Cologne to study composition with Karlheinz Stockhausen, then with André Jolivet and Olivier Messiaen at the Conservatoire de Paris, where he won first prize in composition in 1972. In 1972 he joined the Groupe de Recherches Musicales de l'ORTF. His numerous prizes include the Sacem Grand Prix for chamber music (1977), the Prix Georges Enesco (1983), the Prize for New Talent from the SACD (1989), the Composers' Prize of the Sacem (1990), and the SACEM Grand Prix 1993 for his works overall.

His death was announced on 25 January 2018.

Compositions (selective list)
Concerto for Double-bass and Orchestra, op. 6 (1981)
Concerto for Tuba, Piano, and Orchestra, op. 9 (1982–83)
Concerto for Viola and Orchestra, op. 51 (1997)
Duo for Violin and Viola (1973)
Requiem (1982) ISWC T-003.042.605.1 
Les échos de la mémoire, op. 13, for orchestra (1985)
String Quartet no. 1, op. 15 (1986)
String Quartet no. 2, op. 16 (1986)
Qamar, op. 20, string quintet and string orchestra (1988) 
String Quartet no. 3, op. 23, 1989
Triptyque for cello and orchestra, op. 24 (1989)
Haec Anima …, for 12 or 24 Double-basses (1992)
Mass, op. 42, for organ (1994)
"Narandj" op.38a for harp

References

External links
Composer website
Details on Requiem

1947 births
2018 deaths
20th-century classical composers
21st-century classical composers
Carillonneurs
French classical composers
French male classical composers
Conservatoire de Paris alumni
École Normale de Musique de Paris alumni
Musicians from Paris
Pupils of Karlheinz Stockhausen
20th-century French composers
21st-century French composers
20th-century French male musicians
21st-century French male musicians